John Barney "Dots" Miller (September 9, 1886 – September 5, 1923) was an American professional baseball first baseman and second baseman. He played in Major League Baseball (MLB) from 1909 through 1921 for the Pittsburgh Pirates, St. Louis Cardinals, and Philadelphia Phillies.

Career
Miller started his major league career with the Pirates. In his rookie season, he drove in 87 runs and helped Pittsburgh win the National League pennant and their first World Series title. Miller was the regular second baseman from 1909 to 1911 but then moved over to first base.

In the years since his death (beginning at least as early as a 1935 story penned by one-time Phillies teammate Stan Baumgartner), Miller's nickname has frequently been attributed to a simple misinterpretation of teammate Honus Wagner's heavily accented response, "That's Miller." However, on May 12, 1909, the first day the name "Dots Miller" appeared in a Pittsburgh newspaper, it was made abundantly clear that this was a childhood nickname, stemming from Miller's own German ancestry, and accent. Indeed, this was confirmed in a story published shortly before his death, during his unsuccessful bout with tuberculosis.

In 1913, Miller was traded to the Cardinals, where he continued his good hitting and fielding for the next few years.

In 1918 Miller's career was interrupted while he served in World War I.

Miller became manager of a Pacific Coast League team, the San Francisco Seals, in 1922. He led the club to the pennant in his first year. The following season, the Seals were league with by ten games when, on July 23, Miller was forced to step down after contracting tuberculosis. He died on September 5.

In 1589 games over 12 seasons, Miller posted a .263 batting average (1526-for-5804) with 711 runs, 232 doubles, 108 triples, 32 home runs, 714 RBI, 177 stolen bases, 391 bases on balls, .314 on-base percentage and .357 slugging percentage. He finished his career with a .974 fielding percentage playing at first, second, third base and shortstop. In the 1909 World Series, he hit .250 (7-for-28) with 2 runs, 4 RBI, 3 stolen bases and 2 walks.

Soccer
Miller was also noted as a soccer player.

See also
 List of Major League Baseball career triples leaders
 List of Major League Baseball career stolen bases leaders

References

External links

1886 births
1923 deaths
Major League Baseball first basemen
Major League Baseball second basemen
Pittsburgh Pirates players
St. Louis Cardinals players
Philadelphia Phillies players
Easton (minor league baseball) players
McKeesport Tubers players
San Francisco Seals (baseball) managers
San Francisco Seals (baseball) players
Baseball players from New Jersey
Minor league baseball managers
American soccer players
People from Kearny, New Jersey
Sportspeople from Hudson County, New Jersey
Association footballers not categorized by position
American military personnel of World War I
20th-century deaths from tuberculosis
Tuberculosis deaths in New York (state)